Apparition Mountain is a mountain located in the Palliser Range of Alberta, Canada. Named in 1963 by T.W. Swaddle, he felt that the name was suitable given other local land features such as the Ghost River, Phantom Crag and Devil's Head.

References

Three-thousanders of Alberta
Alberta's Rockies